Gary Anthony Nicholson (born 4 November 1960) is an English former professional footballer who played as a winger in the Football League for Newcastle United, Mansfield Town, York City and Halifax Town and in non-League football for Blyth Spartans, Whitley Bay, North Shields, Guiseley, Gateshead and RTM Newcastle.

References

1960 births
Living people
Sportspeople from Hexham
English footballers
Association football wingers
Newcastle United F.C. players
Mansfield Town F.C. players
York City F.C. players
Halifax Town A.F.C. players
Blyth Spartans A.F.C. players
Whitley Bay F.C. players
North Shields F.C. players
Guiseley A.F.C. players
Gateshead F.C. players
Newcastle Blue Star F.C. players
English Football League players
National League (English football) players
Footballers from Northumberland